John Wilkinson (13 June 1902 – April 1979) was an English footballer who scored 44 goals in 212 appearances in the Football League playing for Sheffield Wednesday, Newcastle United, Lincoln City and Hull City. He then moved into non-league football with Scunthorpe & Lindsey United. He played as an outside left.

References

1902 births
1979 deaths
Wath upon Dearne
English footballers
Association football forwards
Wath Athletic F.C. players
Sheffield Wednesday F.C. players
Newcastle United F.C. players
Lincoln City F.C. players
Sunderland A.F.C. players
Hull City A.F.C. players
Scunthorpe United F.C. players
English Football League players